John Cavosie (January 6, 1908 – March 16, 1995) was an American football player.  He played as a fullback for the Portsmouth Spartans in the National Football League. He was active in the league from 1931-1933, having a career spanning only 3 seasons.

References

1908 births
1995 deaths
People from Shenandoah, Pennsylvania
Portsmouth Spartans players
American football fullbacks
Wisconsin Badgers football players
Players of American football from Pennsylvania